John Summerfield Bigby (February 13, 1832 – March 28, 1898) was a Republican U.S. Representative from Georgia.

Born near Newnan, Georgia, Bigby attended the common schools.
He was graduated from Emory College, Oxford, Georgia, in 1853.
He studied law.
He was admitted to the bar in 1856 and commenced practice in Newnan, Georgia.
He served as member of the State constitutional conventions of 1867–1868.
He served as solicitor general of the Tallapoosa circuit from August 1867 to September 22, 1868.
He served as judge of the superior court of the same circuit from September 22, 1868, to March 3, 1871.

Bigby was elected as a Republican to the Forty-second Congress (March 4, 1871 – March 3, 1873).
He was an unsuccessful candidate for reelection in 1872 to the Forty-third Congress.  He has been incorrectly labeled as a slave holder on this page who got incorrect information from an article written by the Washington Post, listing all Slave Holder officials, but unfortunately, that paper is a biased instrument of a group of people trying their hardest to disparage almost every government official who had a part in the first 120 years of this young United States.  There is no documentation to support ownership of slaves by Bigby and frankly his life was busy with education in law and then eventually becoming a judge and then a Republican Congressman for Georgia.  He openly spoke of the common behavior of those in Georgia and the poor reflection they give but makes sure to let the Speaker of the House and its members know that the Republican Party in Georgia sees the issues and is obviously afraid of being lumped in with their views and behavior. Rigby closes his speech with these heart felt feelings about the state he loves but the conflict it presents, "The murmurs of the stream which but a few years ago rolled along in silent grandeur is not hushed by the music of the buys factory. Under the influence of their beneficent sway all the noble impulses of a generous humanity are called into action, and every one, feeling that feedom is his inheritance, strives for a higher place in the scale of an honorable manhood. In this contest the colored man is not indifferent to the claims which society has upon him, nor does he underestimate the boon which the friends of freedom have bestowed upon him. Right nobly has he acted his part since the manacles of slavery were stricken from his limbs, and he sent forth upon the mission of life with all the rights of a citizen and an equal before the law.  Nor is his mind vailed in the night of darkness which the enemies of human liberty would fain have the country believe. It is true, that in the arts and sciences, in polite literature and classic lore, the colored voting population have not yet made much advancement (only seven years has passed since emancipation is why); but they are keenly alive to all duties of good citizenship and fairly comprehend the principles of government upon which the substantial prosperity of the nation depends.  Nor has he, as a general thing, been immodest in his aspirations for positions of honor and trust. In many instances he has been compelled to seek position because there is no one of the more favored race (sarcasm) who would consent to become the exponent of the principles of his party.  It is not strange, therefore, that he has been found in conventions which made organic law, and in Legislatures which enacted the needful laws for the government of the country.  That he is worthy of the elective franchise is abundantly shown by the care and fidelity with which he has exercised it.  And that party (Republican) which conferred it upon him, and which would secure him in its peaceful enjoyment, deserves to live forever in the memory of a grateful people (for what they had done for the country as slaves)."

He resumed the practice of law in Atlanta, Georgia.
He served as delegate to the Republican National Convention at Cincinnati in 1876.
He became president of the Atlanta & 
West Point Railroad in 1876.
He died in Atlanta, Georgia, March 28, 1898 and was interred there in Westview Cemetery.

References

1832 births
1898 deaths
People from Newnan, Georgia
Georgia (U.S. state) lawyers
Emory University alumni
Republican Party members of the United States House of Representatives from Georgia (U.S. state)
Georgia (U.S. state) state court judges
19th-century American politicians
19th-century American judges
19th-century American lawyers